Wenz may refer to:

Broadcasting
WENZ, a radio station (107.9 FM) licensed to Cleveland, Ohio, United States

People
Alfred Wenz (1919–1944), a German soldier
Fred Wenz aka Frederick Charles Wenz (born 1941), a baseball player
Peter Wenz (born 1945), an Emeritus Professor of Philosophy at the University of Illinois at Springfield
Wilhelm August Wenz (1886–1945), a German malacologist

See also
Latinxua Sin Wenz, a little-used romanization system for Mandarin Chinese.
Wentz
Wenzel
Wentzel

German-language surnames
Broadcast call sign disambiguation pages